Gretchen A. Ulion (born May 4, 1972)  is an American ice hockey player. She won a gold medal at the 1998 Winter Olympics. At Dartmouth College, she was and is still today the Dartmouth Big Green women's ice hockey program's all-time leading scorer with 189 goals and 312 points, served as the captain of the Dartmouth Big Green during the 1993–94 season, and was twice the Ivy League Player of the Year.

In the gold medal game at the 1998 Winter Olympics, Ulion scored the first goal of the game. It was also the first ever goal scored in an Olympic women's ice hockey gold medal game. Ulion was featured on the Wheaties box in 1998.

Along with the rest of the 1998 gold medal-winning team, Ulion was admitted to the U.S. Hockey Hall of Fame in 2009. She also received a Gold Key from the Connecticut Sports Writers’ Alliance on April 29, 2018.

In addition to serving as a U18 instructor and motivational speaker for USA Hockey, Ulion is the head of the girls' hockey program at the Taft School, where she also teaches math and works in the admissions office.

Personal life 
In 1990, Ulion graduated from The Loomis Chaffee School, where she played hockey under long-time coach Chuck Vernon.

Ulion married Steven Silverman on July 11, 1998, and is now known as Gretchen Silverman.

References

External links
Taft School profile
Gotta Love CT Hockey video interview
Loomis Chaffee interview with Ulion in 2010

1972 births
American women's ice hockey forwards
Dartmouth Big Green women's ice hockey players
Ice hockey players from Connecticut
Ice hockey players at the 1998 Winter Olympics
Living people
Medalists at the 1998 Winter Olympics
Olympic gold medalists for the United States in ice hockey
People from Marlborough, Connecticut
Loomis Chaffee School alumni